Gausbert (died 931) was the count of Empúries and Rosselló from 915 until he died.  He was the son of Sunyer II of Empúries and brother of Bencion.

With the murder of his father, the counties passed to him and Bencion, but Bencion died in 916 and all the inheritance fell to Gausbert.  In 924, he participated in a campaign with the margrave of Gothia against invading Moors.  In 927, he rebuilt Saint Martin of Ampurias.

He married Trudegarda, with whom he had the following issue:

Sunifred, died young 
Gausfred I (died 991), his successor
Ermengarda (died 994), married Oliba Cabreta

|-

931 deaths
Counts of Empúries
Counts of Roussillon
Year of birth unknown
10th-century Catalan people